The women's 3000 metres steeplechase event at the 2004 World Junior Championships in Athletics was held in Grosseto, Italy, at Stadio Olimpico Carlo Zecchini on 13 and 15 July.

Medalists

Results

Final
15 July

Heats
13 July

Heat 1

Heat 2

Heat 3

Participation
According to an unofficial count, 45 athletes from 28 countries participated in the event.

References

3000 metres steeplechasechase
Steeplechase at the World Athletics U20 Championships